"Shopping Trolley" was a 2006 single by English songwriter Beth Orton. It was released as a 2 CD single set and 12 inch vinyl, and an early version of the title song can be purchased from iTunes.

Track listing

CD: EMI / CDEM 694 United Kingdom 

 "Shopping Trolley"
 "Comfort of Strangers"

CD: EMI / CDEMS 694 United Kingdom 
 "Shopping Trolley"
 "Comfort of Strangers"
 "Pieces of Sky (Early Version)"

 CD includes video for "Shopping Trolley" on enhanced portion

CD: EMI / CDEMDJ 694 United Kingdom 
 "Shopping Trolley"
 "Shopping Trolley (Instrumental)"

 UK promo

iTunes
 "Shopping Trolley (Early Version)"

Beth Orton songs
2006 singles
2006 songs
Astralwerks singles
EMI Records singles
Songs written by Beth Orton